Lake Llanquihue is the second-largest lake in Chile with an area of about , after Lake General Carrera which shared with Argentina. It is situated in the southern Los Lagos Region in the Llanquihue and Osorno provinces. The lake's fan-like form was created by successive piedmont glaciers during the Quaternary glaciations. The last glacial period is called Llanquihue glaciation in Chile after the terminal moraine systems around the lake.

Some historians consider Llanquihue Lake to have been within the range of ancient Chono nomadism.

Lake Llanquihue is located in southern Chile a territory of northern Patagonia in the Los Lagos Region. The lake's views of Volcán Osorno make the surrounding cities such as Puerto Varas tourism hotspots.

Gallery

References

External links

 

Llanquihue
Lakes of Los Lagos Region